Acer tibetense is an uncommon Asian species of maple. It has been found only in Tibet.

Acer tibetense is a deciduous  tree up to 10 meters tall. Leaves are non-compound, up to 9 cm wide and 8 cm across, thin, usually with 3 lobes but no teeth.

References

External links
drawing for Flora of China drawing 1 at bottom

tibetense
Plants described in 1939
Flora of Tibet